Tokunaga (徳永 or 德永) is a Japanese surname. Notable people with the surname include:

Tokunaga clan, Japanese clan
, Japanese voice actress
, Japanese composer
, Japanese singer
, Japanese actress
, Japanese politician
, Japanese singer
, Japanese politician
 Sunao Tokunaga, Japanese writer
, Japanese rugby sevens player
, Japanese footballer

See also
7160 Tokunaga, asteroid
Tokunaga Station, Japanese train station

Japanese-language surnames